The 2004 FIA GT Oschersleben 500 km was the ninth round the 2004 FIA GT Championship season.  It took place at the Motorsport Arena Oschersleben, Germany, on September 19, 2004.

Following the debut of the MC12 at the previous round in Imola, AF Corse scored their maiden victory here in Oschersleben.  The team and their drivers were however still ineligible to score points due to the MC12's homologations problems.

Official results
Class winners in bold.  Cars failing to complete 70% of winner's distance marked as Not Classified (NC).

Statistics
 Pole position – #4 Konrad Motorsport – 1:23.543
 Fastest lap – #5 Vitaphone Racing Team – 1:24.701
 Average speed – 143.810 km/h

References

 
 
 

O
Oschersleben 500